Mylopharyngodon is a genus of fish belongs to the family Cyprinidae, it contains two species: the living black carp (Mylopharyngodon piceus) and the fossil species Mylopharyngodon wui from the Middle Miocene of China.

References

Cyprinidae genera
Squaliobarbinae
Taxa named by Wilhelm Peters
Fish genera with one living species